The 3rd Lumières Awards ceremony, presented by the Académie des Lumières, was held on 15 December 1998. The ceremony was chaired by Fanny Ardant. Robert Guédiguian's Marius and Jeannette won the Best Film award.

Winners

See also
 23rd César Awards

References

External links
 
 
 3rd Lumières Awards at AlloCiné

Lumières Awards
Lumières
Lumières